Silā (Nepal Bhasa: 𑐳𑐶𑐮𑐵, सिला) is the fourth month in the Nepal Era calendar, the national lunar calendar of Nepal. The month corresponds to Magha (माघ) in the Hindu lunar calendar and February in the Gregorian calendar.

Silā begins with the new moon and the full moon falls on the 15th of the lunar month. The month is divided into the bright and dark fortnights which are known as Silā Thwa (सिला थ्व) and Silā Gā (सिला गा) respectively.

The most important festivals during the month are Shree Panchami which falls on the fifth day of the bright fortnight and Maha Shivaratri (Nepal Bhasa: सिला चह्रे Silā Charhe) on the 14th day of the dark fortnight. Shree Panchami is the first day of spring while Shivaratri honors the Hindu deity Shiva. On the full moon day, the month-long Swasthani sacred story reciting festival ends.

Days in the month

Months of the year

References

Months
Nepali calendar
Nepalese culture